Lewis Township is the name of some places in the U.S. state of Pennsylvania:

Located in this fine township of Union County is Millmont and Hartleton. 

Lewis Township, Lycoming County, Pennsylvania
Lewis Township, Northumberland County, Pennsylvania
Lewis Township, Union County, Pennsylvania

Pennsylvania township disambiguation pages